Anthony Neuberger is an academic in the United Kingdom, currently Professor of Finance at Cass Business School. Neuberger has previously held senior positions at other academic institutions including Warwick Business School and London Business School.

Education and career
Neuberger was born in 1951. He attended Trinity College, Cambridge (BA, 1969–73) and the London Business School (MBA, 1983–85; PhD, 1985–91). He held positions at London Business School (1991-2004), Warwick Business School (2004-2013) and joined Cass Business School in 2013.

Family
His father Albert was an academic, and his uncle Herman was a rabbi. His brothers are David (a judge and former UK Supreme Court President), James (a medical doctor), and Michael (a biochemist). He is married to Julia Neuberger, a rabbi. The couple have two children, Harriet and Matthew.

References

Date of birth missing (living people)
Living people
Anthony
English Jews
Academics of Bayes Business School
Academics of the University of Warwick
English people of German-Jewish descent
Alumni of Trinity College, Cambridge
Alumni of London Business School
Spouses of life peers
Year of birth missing (living people)